Hitra may refer to:

Places
Hitra, a municipality in Trøndelag county, Norway
Hitra (island), an island in the municipality of Hitra in Trøndelag county, Norway
Hitra Church, a church in the municipality of Hitra in Trøndelag county, Norway
Hitra Tunnel, a tunnel connecting the island of Hitra to the mainland of Norway
Hitra Wind Farm, a 24-turbine wind farm located in the municipality of Hitra in Norway

Other
HNoMS Hitra, a Royal Norwegian Navy submarine chaser that saw action during World War II
Hitra official football team, the official football team for the Norwegian municipality of Hitra

See also
Hidra (disambiguation)
Hirta (disambiguation)